Kar Nam (also Romanized as Kār Nām; also known as Gornām-e Soflá, Kārnām-e Pā’īn, and Kārnām-e Soflá) is a village in Garmab Rural District, Chahardangeh District, Sari County, Mazandaran Province, Iran. At the 2006 census, its population was 278, in 73 families.

References 

Populated places in Sari County